Idrissa is a masculine given name. Notable people with the name include:

Idrissa Adam (born 1984), Cameroonian sprinter
Idrissa Camara, Guinean-born dancer and choreographer
Idrissa Camará (born 1992), Bissau-Guinean footballer
Idrissa Coulibaly (born 1987), Malian footballer
Idrissa Dione (born 1929), French boxer
Idrissa Djaló (born 1962), Bissau-Guinean politician
Idrissa Doumbia (born 1998), Ivorian footballer
Idrissa "Idris" Elba (born 1972), English actor, producer and musician
Idrissa Gueye (born 1989), Senegalese footballer
Idrissa Halidou (born 1982), Nigerien footballer
Idrissa Kabore (born 1977), Burkinabé boxer
Idrissa Keita (born 1977), Ivorian footballer
Idrissa Kouyaté (born 1991), Ivorian footballer
Idrissa Laouali (born 1979), Nigerien footballer
Ydrissa M'Barke (born 1983), French sprinter
Idrissa Mandiang (born 1984), Senegalese footballer
Idrissa Niang (born 1992), Senegalese footballer
Idrissa Ouédraogo (1954–2018), Burkinabé filmmaker
Idrisa Sambú (born 1998), Portuguese footballer
Idrissa Sangaré (born 1987), Malian footballer
Idrissa Sanou (born 1977), Burkinabé sprinter
Idrissa Seck (born 1959), Senegalese politician
Idrissa Sylla (born 1990), Guinean footballer
Idrissa Thiam (born 2000), Mauritanian footballer
Idrissa Timta (1942–2014), Nigerian traditional leader
Idrissa Touré (born 1998), German footballer
Idrissa Traoré (disambiguation), multiple people

See also
Edrissa
Driss
Idris (name)
Idriss

African masculine given names